Danialle Karmanos (born May 10, 1973) is an American philanthropist, humanitarian, activist, and social entrepreneur. In 2017, Karmanos founded The Cuddlers, a volunteer-based movement started at Children's Hospital of Michigan to cuddle and comfort hospitalized infants and children.

Career
Since 2017, Karmanos has served on the board of trustees at Detroit Country Day School, a K-12 college preparatory school located in Oakland County, Michigan.

Karmanos and her husband, Peter Karmanos Jr., established the Karmanos Center for Natural Birth at William Beaumont Hospital in Royal Oak, Michigan in 2015.

In 2005, Karmanos founded Danialle Karmanos Work It Out (DKWIO).

Karmanos has been a mom's columnist for Styleline Magazine and a guest blogger for Metromodemedia.com. She is the author of the hardcover book about her husband entitled, Pete Karmanos – A Life in Progress.

Karmanos was elected to the Wayne State University Board of Governors and served from 2011 to 2013.  She was named by Michigan Governor Jennifer Granholm to serve on the Michigan Film Office Advisory Council in 2008.  Karmanos currently serves on the board of trustees for the College for Creative Studies, the Board of Directors for the Michigan Opera Theatre and is a founding member, board member and former Chair of the Museum of Contemporary Art Detroit. Karmanos is also a member of the Leadership Advisory Board of the A. Alfred Taubman Medical Research Institute at the University of Michigan and serves on the Board Development Committee of the Girl Scouts of Southeastern Michigan.

From 2002 to 2005, Karmanos produced and directed concept car reveals for North American International Auto Show. In 2006, she wrote, co-produced, and directed the award-winning "I Am Detroit" for Compuware Corporation.

Karmanos was an auto show narrator for Acura from 1997 to 1999 and Chrysler Corporation from 1999 to 2002.

Education
Karmanos attended Fairlane Christian High School in Dearborn Heights, Michigan before graduating from Dearborn High School. While attending Fairlane Christian, she was honored by the Daughters of the American Revolution and Who's Who Among American High School Students for written essays.

Karmanos played soccer on an academic scholarship at Lee University in Cleveland, Tennessee. She earned her Bachelor of Arts degree in journalism, graduating with honors, from Wayne State University in 1999.

Awards and honors
In 2018, Karmanos received an honorary Doctor of Humane Letters degree from Hellenic American University.

Karmanos has also received numerous awards for her community service, philanthropy and contributions to the metropolitan Detroit community.  She received the American Heart Association's "Cor Vitae Award" for community service; The Matilda R. Wilson Award from Boys & Girls Clubs of Southeastern Michigan; the MBPA Women and Leadership's "Distinguished Leadership Award for Philanthropy;" and the Greater Wayne County Chapter of The Links' "Innovator in Health and Wellness" award.  In 2007, Karmanos was named to Crain's Detroit Business' "40 Under 40" list of young achievers in recognition of her career achievements.

She has been featured in Hour Magazine's Best-Dressed list.

Philanthropy
In addition to DKWIO and the Karmanos Center for Natural Childbirth, Karmanos and her husband have provided significant financial support to the Karmanos Cancer Institute in Detroit, Wayne State University's journalism program, the College for Creative Studies, the Detroit Zoo, Alzheimer's Association, Michigan Humane Society, Dutch Symphony Orchestra, Grace Centers of Hope, Girl Scouts of the USA and the Greek America Foundation.

References

External links
 Bloomberg: Executive Profile & Biography

1973 births
Living people
21st-century American journalists
American corporate directors
Journalists from Michigan
Philanthropists from Michigan
Wayne State University alumni
21st-century American women